Saros cycle series 116 for solar eclipses occurs at the Moon's descending node, repeating every 18 years, 11 days, containing 70 events. All eclipses in this series occurs at the Moon's descending node.

This solar saros is linked to Lunar Saros 109.

Solar Saros 116 
Lunar Saros 109 interleaves with this solar saros with an event occurring every 9 years 5 days alternating between each saros series.

Umbral eclipses
Umbral eclipses (annular, total and hybrid) can be further classified as either: 1) Central (two limits), 2) Central (one limit) or 3) Non-Central (one limit). The statistical distribution of these classes in Saros series 116 appears in the following table.

Events

References 
 NASA - Catalog of Solar Eclipses of Saros 116

External links
Saros cycle 116 - Information and visualization (Solar-Eclipse info)

Solar saros series